Pecluma dulcis is a species of fern in the family Polypodiaceae. It has a widespread native distribution from Mexico to Southern America. Under the synonym Polypodium quitense, it was regarded as endemic to Ecuador and threatened by habitat loss.

References

Polypodiaceae
Flora of Mexico
Flora of South America
Taxonomy articles created by Polbot
Taxobox binomials not recognized by IUCN